Vice Great Seneschal of Ireland, is not a formal title of office, but describes a functional role under the aegis of the Hereditary Great Seneschal or Lord High Steward of Ireland, the latter acting under royal authority dating back several centuries. The function was assigned to the Hereditary Seneschal or Lord Steward for Tyrconnell, Patrick Denis O'Donnell (1922–2005). The lately appointment with this dignity and honour to date was to Joerg Barisch Esquire (1971-present). 

The precedent for the Lord High Steward/Great Seneschal to appoint a deputy through an appointment as Seneschal or Lord Steward of a County is found in the case of the appointment, of John Penyngton as Steward of the Liberty of Wexford. Appointments by the Lords Shrewsbury of deputies to serve as Stewards of Counties in Ireland were upheld by the House of Lords as proof of the exercise of the prerogatives of the Lord High Steward of Ireland.

The functional role as deputy consists of acting in the place of the Lord High Steward, if required, to bear the Curtana, a Sword of State, and/or a White Wand at State ceremonials, including Royal Coronations, a responsibility confirmed by grant of Queen Victoria on 15 September 1871, and formerly to act as President of the Court by which a Peer may have been tried by his Peers in the Peerage of Ireland.

Notwithstanding that the island of Ireland now comprises a sovereign country, Ireland, and a province of the United Kingdom, Northern Ireland, the Vice Great Seneschal of Ireland role is still fulfilled in the United Kingdom.

Deputised Lords High Stewards or Great Seneschals of Ireland
The following were appointed to preside in the trials by the Irish House of Lords of Peers indicted for various crimes, and their ceremonial roles were limited to those appertaining to their temporary judicial role.
 1739:  Thomas Wyndham (1681–1745), 1st Baron Wyndham of Finglass
 1743:  Robert Jocelyn (1727–1756), 1st Viscount Jocelyn
 1798:  John FitzGibbon (1749–1802), 1st Earl of Clare

References

History of Ireland (1801–1923)
Early Modern Ireland
Political office-holders in pre-partition Ireland